The 2005 NC State Wolfpack football team represented North Carolina State University during the 2005 NCAA Division I-A football season. The team's head coach was Chuck Amato.  NC State has been a member of the Atlantic Coast Conference (ACC) since the league's inception in 1953, and participated in that conference's Atlantic Division in 2005, the inaugural year for the division. The Wolfpack played its home games in 2005 at Carter–Finley Stadium in Raleigh, North Carolina, which has been NC State football's home stadium since 1966.

Schedule

References

NC State
NC State Wolfpack football seasons
Duke's Mayo Bowl champion seasons
NC State Wolfpack football